East Windsor is a township in Mercer County, in the U.S. state of New Jersey. Located within the Raritan Valley region, the township is an outer-ring suburb of New York City in the New York Metropolitan area, as defined by the United States Census Bureau, but directly borders the Philadelphia metropolitan area and is part of the Federal Communications Commission's Philadelphia Designated Market Area. As of the 2020 United States census, the township's population was 30,045, an increase of 2,855 (+10.5%) from the 2010 census count of 27,190, which in turn reflected an increase of 2,271 (+9.1%) from the 24,919 counted in the 2000 census.

Both East Windsor and West Windsor were formed when Windsor Township was split on February 9, 1797, while the area was still part of Middlesex County. It was incorporated by an act of the New Jersey Legislature on February 21, 1798, as one of New Jersey's initial group of 104 townships. Portions of the township were taken to form Hightstown borough (March 5, 1853, within East Windsor; became independent ) and Washington Township (March 11, 1860, and known as Robbinsville Township since 2007). The township was named for Windsor Township, which was named for Windsor, England.

Geography

According to the United States Census Bureau, the township had a total area of 15.66 square miles (40.55 km2), including 15.57 square miles (40.32 km2) of land and 0.09 square miles (0.23 km2) of water (0.57%).

Twin Rivers (2010 Census population of 7,443) is an unincorporated community and census-designated place (CDP) located within East Windsor Township. According to "New Jersey: A Guide to the State" by Barbara Westergaard, Twin Rivers was "New Jersey's first planned unit development" and "has attracted the scrutiny of countless researchers, from sociologists and anthropologists to specialists in energy conservation."  Other unincorporated communities, localities and place names located completely or partially within East Windsor include Allens Station, Eilers Corner, Etra, Hickory Corner, Locust Corner, Millstone and Washington Oak.

The township borders Robbinsville Township and West Windsor Township in Mercer County; Cranbury Township, Monroe Township and Plainsboro Township in Middlesex County; and both Millstone Township and Upper Freehold Township in Monmouth County. East Windsor completely surrounds the independent borough of Hightstown, making it part one of 21 pairs of "doughnut towns" in the state, where one municipality entirely surrounds another.

The Meadow Lakes continuing care retirement community occupies a  site that straddles the East Windsor-Hightstown boundary line.

Ecology
According to the A. W. Kuchler U.S. potential natural vegetation types, East Windsor, New Jersey would have an Appalachian Oak (104) vegetation type with an Eastern Hardwood Forest (25) vegetation form.

Climate
According to the Köppen climate classification system, East Windsor, New Jersey has a hot-summer, wet all year, humid continental climate (Dfa). Dfa climates are characterized by at least one month having an average mean temperature ≤ 32.0 °F (≤ 0.0 °C), at least four months with an average mean temperature ≥ 50.0 °F (≥ 10.0 °C), at least one month with an average mean temperature ≥ 71.6 °F (≥ 22.0 °C), and no significant precipitation difference between seasons. During the summer months, episodes of extreme heat and humidity can occur with heat index values ≥ 100 °F (≥ 38 °C). On average, the wettest month of the year is July which corresponds with the annual peak in thunderstorm activity. During the winter months, episodes of extreme cold and wind can occur with wind chill values < 0 °F (< −18 °C). The plant hardiness zone at the East Windsor Municipal Court is 7a with an average annual extreme minimum air temperature of 0.0 °F (−17.8 °C).

Demographics

2010 census

The Census Bureau's 2006–2010 American Community Survey showed that (in 2010 inflation-adjusted dollars) median household income was $84,503 (with a margin of error of +/− $4,345) and the median family income was $100,411 (+/− $4,485). Males had a median income of $70,057 (+/− $6,291) versus $44,089 (+/− $2,948) for females. The per capita income for the borough was $37,876 (+/− $1,490). About 3.0% of families and 5.0% of the population were below the poverty line, including 4.2% of those under age 18 and 5.4% of those age 65 or over.

2000 census
As of the 2000 United States census there were 24,919 people, 9,448 households, and 6,556 families residing in the township. The population density was 1,592.8 people per square mile (614.8/km2). There were 9,880 housing units at an average density of 631.5 per square mile (243.8/km2). The racial makeup of the township was 74.42% White, 8.90% African American, 0.20% Native American, 9.55% Asian, 0.12% Pacific Islander, 4.61% from other races, and 2.20% from two or more races. Hispanic or Latino of any race were 14.28% of the population.

There were 9,448 households, out of which 34.2% had children under the age of 18 living with them, 55.6% were married couples living together, 9.6% had a female householder with no husband present, and 30.6% were non-families. 24.6% of all households were made up of individuals, and 6.6% had someone living alone who was 65 years of age or older. The average household size was 2.61 and the average family size was 3.12.

The population of the township was spread out, with 24.0% under the age of 18, 7.6% from 18 to 24, 35.2% from 25 to 44, 24.9% from 45 to 64, and 8.3% who were 65 years of age or older. The median age was 36 years. For every 100 females, there were 95.2 males. For every 100 females age 18 and over, there were 91.6 males.

The median income for a household in the township was $63,616, and the median income for a family was $73,461. Males had a median income of $50,875 versus $35,260 for females. The per capita income for the township was $28,695. About 2.8% of families and 5.3% of the population were below the poverty line, including 4.3% of those under age 18 and 8.1% of those age 65 or over.

Economy
Pharmaceutical firms located in East Windsor include Hovione, CoreTech, Aprecia, Sabinsa, Novotec, Aurobindo and Windsor Labs.

Government

Local government
East Windsor has been governed since 1970 within the Faulkner Act, formally known as the Optional Municipal Charter Law, under the Council-Manager form of government. The township is one of 42 municipalities (of the 564) statewide that use this form of government. The council is comprised of seven members elected at-large for four-year terms of office on a staggered basis, with either three or four seats up for vote in odd-numbered years as part of the November general election. In a reorganization meeting held each January, the council selects a mayor and a deputy mayor from among its members for a one-year term.

, members of the East Windsor Council are Mayor Janice S. Mironov (D, term on council and as mayor ends December 31, 2023), Deputy Mayor Peter V. Yeager (D, term on council and as deputy mayor ends 2023), Denise Daniels (D, 2025), Marc Lippman (D, 2023), Alan Rosenberg (D, 2025), David Russell (D, 2025) and John Zoller (D, 2023).

In December 2015, the Township Council appointed Denise Daniels to fill the seat expiring in December 2017 that became vacant following the death of Hector Duke earlier that month.

Designed during the 1970s energy crisis and constructed in 1982, the township's municipal building was erected within a landscaped man-made hill, with only its south side exposed. The design allows the building to maintain a comfortable climate inside for most of the year, with greatly reduced energy needs. The passive solar design allows the building to reduce energy consumption by 60% compared to conventional office buildings of the same size.

Cyber breach 

On February 24, 2022, The computer servers of the East Windsor Municipal Offices were breached. Numerous residents contacted the Township to report the issue, which went unacknowledged for nearly two weeks. East Windsor officials said they first became aware of a municipal cyber breach on March 7, but a letter confirming receipt of an insurance claim contains a loss date from six days earlier. The Windsor-Hights Herald contacted Mayor Mironov by email March 7 and March 14 for comment and explanation, but she did not respond. By March 17, the Township was still attempting to restore operations. Several residents who were professional IT managers and cybersecurity experts offered to assist for free, but were never contacted back by the township. Two months after the initial incident, Township officials had not divulged who was behind the hack or any of the steps taken to prevent future incidents. On May 9, a local cybersecurity expert filed a 13-item Open Public Records Act request with the Township, including requests for "All documentation as to the scope and nature of the incident that is currently known” and “all documentation as to what personal records were released”. Those records were received on May 19 by the resident and the Windsor-Hights Herald. The records contradicted the timeline provided by the Township. The incident received national and international coverage, as it was reported nationally by MSN. It was reported on NJ.com on May 10 that while the Township had claimed to first be aware of the breach on March 7, the Township had actually submitted an insurance claim six days earlier. On May 26, it was reported that unauthorized access to the system also allowed access to certain data relating to individuals associated with the township. It was reported on May 31, 2022, that Township Manager Jim Brady received an email March 2 from a cyber threat intelligence analyst from the New Jersey Cybersecurity and Communications Integration Cell (NJCCIC), which stated that the agency's email security tool had picked up a few emails that used a display name to spoof—or impersonate—East Windsor Township email users. Brady replied March 3 to the cyber threat intelligence analyst, and wrote that the Township was aware of the issue despite the later claim that the Township was not yet aware of the incident It was also reported that over 900 people have had their personal information compromised—potentially including their birth date, driver's license and social security number—following the cyber breach.

Emergency services
East Windsor is served by East Windsor Rescue Squad District I (Squad 142) and Rescue Squad District II (Squad 146). Fire protection is provided by East Windsor Volunteer Fire Department 1 (Station 42) and Volunteer Fire Department 2 (Station 46). The Township is split for faster response times, with Rescue Squad District II and Fire Department 2 serving Twin Rivers and the eastern portion of the Township.

The East Windsor Police Department, located on One Mile Road, is led by Chief James A. Geary, and employs 30 uniformed patrol and Traffic Enforcement Officers, 5 Detectives, 7 Dispatchers and Communications Officers and two Animal Control Officers, for a total of 43 sworn officers.

Federal, state, and county representation
East Windsor is located in the 3rd Congressional District and is part of New Jersey's 14th state legislative district.

Prior to the 2011 reapportionment following the 2010 Census, East Windsor had been in the 12th state legislative district.

Politics
As of March 2011, there were a total of 14,729 registered voters in East Windsor, of which 5,194 (35.3%) were registered as Democrats, 2,120 (14.4%) were registered as Republicans and 7,396 (50.2%) were registered as Unaffiliated. There were 19 voters registered as Libertarians or Greens.

In the 2012 presidential election, Democrat Barack Obama received 66.0% of the vote (7,156 cast), ahead of Republican Mitt Romney with 32.7% (3,548 votes) and other candidates with 1.3% (143 votes), among the 11,821 ballots cast by the township's 15,852 registered voters (974 ballots were spoiled), for a turnout of 74.6%. In the 2008 presidential election, Democrat Barack Obama received 66.5% of the vote (7,659 cast), ahead of Republican John McCain with 31.4% (3,624 votes) and other candidates with 1.2% (136 votes), among the 11,524 ballots cast by the township's 15,401 registered voters, for a turnout of 74.8%.

In the 2013 gubernatorial election, Republican Chris Christie received 58.4% of the vote (3,736 cast), ahead of Democrat Barbara Buono with 39.7% (2,537 votes) and other candidates with 1.9% (119 votes), among the 6,536 ballots cast by the township's 15,663 registered voters (144 ballots were spoiled), for a turnout of 41.7%. In the 2009 gubernatorial election, Democrat Jon Corzine received 47.2% of the vote (3,439 ballots cast), ahead of Republican Chris Christie with 45.5% (3,319 votes), Independent Chris Daggett with 5.6% (411 votes) and other candidates with 1.1% (79 votes), among the 7,288 ballots cast by the township's 14,999 registered voters, yielding a 48.6% turnout.

Education
Students in public school for pre-kindergarten through twelfth grade attend the East Windsor Regional School District, which serves students from East Windsor and Hightstown. As of the 2020–21 school year, the district, comprised of six schools, had an enrollment of 5,123 students and 466.0 classroom teachers (on an FTE basis), for a student–teacher ratio of 11.0:1. Public school students in seventh through twelfth grades from Roosevelt Borough (a community in Monmouth County are sent to the district's schools as part of a sending/receiving relationship with the Roosevelt Public School District. The seats on the nine-member board of education are allocated based on the population of the constituent municipalities, with seven seats assigned to East Windsor.

Schools in the district (with 2020–21 enrollment data from the National Center for Education Statistics) are 
Walter C. Black Elementary School with 491 students in grades K–2, 
Ethel McKnight Elementary School with 539 students in grades K–2, 
Perry L. Drew Elementary School with 567 students in grades 3–5, 
Grace N. Rogers Elementary School with 561 students in grades Pre-K / 3–5, 
Melvin H. Kreps Middle School with 1,237 students in grades 6–8 and 
Hightstown High School with 1,658 students in grades 9–12.

Eighth grade students from all of Mercer County are eligible to apply to attend the high school programs offered by the Mercer County Technical Schools, a county-wide vocational school district that offers full-time career and technical education at its Health Sciences Academy, STEM Academy and Academy of Culinary Arts, with no tuition charged to students for attendance.

Infrastructure

Transportation

Roads and highways

Several major highways serve East Windsor. The most prominent among them is the New Jersey Turnpike (Interstate 95). One exit, Exit 8, is located within East Windsor, connecting the turnpike to Route 33 and Route 133 ("Hightstown Bypass"). Route 33 runs east to west across the southern and eastern portions of the township while Route 133 forms a bypass of Hightstown, connecting Route 33 on the east side of East Windsor to County Route 571 on the west side. U.S. Route 130 crosses the western portions of East Windsor with a north–south orientation parallel to the turnpike, forming a concurrency with Route 33 in the southern portion of the township. The township is also served by County Route 535 and County Route 539.

Public transportation
Suburban Transit offers commuter service to and from the Port Authority Bus Terminal in Midtown Manhattan on the 300 Route and to and from Wall Street in Downtown Manhattan on the 600 Route.

The nearest NJ Transit rail service is available at the Princeton Junction station. Shuttle bus service to the Princeton Junction station is available during rush hour.

Mercer County offers a shuttle service providing access to major businesses and transportation hubs in the area along Route 130 as well as a local shuttle within the area.

Healthcare
East Windsor is served by CentraState Healthcare System, which is affiliated with Rutgers Robert Wood Johnson Medical School, located in nearby Freehold Township. The regional hospital is a 287-bed medical facility. CentraState Healthcare system also provides healthcare through its various family practices in communities across central New Jersey. One of those six family practices has an office located in East Windsor on U.S. Route 130. The next closest hospitals to the township include the Hamilton Division of Robert Wood Johnson University Hospital in nearby Hamilton and Penn Medicine Princeton Medical Center in nearby Plainsboro Township.

Notable people

People who were born in, residents of, or otherwise closely associated with East Windsor Township include:

 Clara Barton (1821–1912), founder of the American Red Cross, taught at the Cedarville Road School in East Windsor 1851–1852
 Rich Gunnell (born 1987), college football coach
 Guy Hutchinson (born 1974),  author, broadcaster, theme park historian and comedian
 Lisa P. Jackson (born 1962), Administrator of the Environmental Protection Agency (EPA)
 Marlon LeBlanc (born 1976), head coach for the West Virginia Mountaineers men's soccer team
 Loretta Long (born 1940), actress, voice artist, singer, media personality and educator who played the character of Susan Robinson on Sesame Street, from its debut in 1969 until 2015
 Zubin Mehenti, sportscaster and radio host who joined ESPN in 2011 and has served as the anchor for several variations of the channel's flagship program, SportsCenter
 Dakota Mills (born 1997), soccer forward who plays for the Saint Kitts and Nevis women's national team
 Tony Paige (born 1953), radio talk show host on WFAN
 Randal Pinkett (born 1971), business consultant who was the winner of The Apprentice season 4
 Al Rosenberg, comedy writer for Imus in the Morning and The Howard Stern Show, who has served as a councilman since 2002
 Carl Emil Schorske (1915–2015), cultural historian who won the Pulitzer Prize for General Non-Fiction in 1981
 Anton Strout (born 1970), urban fantasy novelist
 Jimmy Takter (born 1960), harness racing horse trainer who was inducted into the Harness Racing Hall of Fame in 2012
 Nick Williams (born 1990), wide receiver who has played in the NFL for the Washington Commanders and Atlanta Falcons

References

External links

East Windsor Township Website
East Windsor Township School Website
East Windsor MUA

 
1797 establishments in New Jersey
Faulkner Act (council–manager)
Populated places established in 1797
Townships in Mercer County, New Jersey